Charles Dana may refer to:

 Charles A. Dana (philanthropist) (1881–1975) of the Dana Foundation, and New York State legislator and industrialist
 Charles Anderson Dana (1819–1897), U.S. journalist, author, government official
 Charles Loomis Dana (1852–1935), neurologist
 Charles R. Dana (1802–1868), Latter-day Saint leader and politician
 Charles S. Dana (1862–1939), Speaker of the Vermont House of Representatives
 Charles W. Dana, 19th-century California State Assembly member

See also
 Charles Dana Gibson (1867–1944), American artist
 Charles Dana Wilber (1830–1891), American land speculator and journalist
 Dana (disambiguation)